{{DISPLAYTITLE:C4H7NO2}}
The molecular formula C4H7NO2 may refer to:

 (Z)-4-Amino-2-butenoic acid
 1-Aminocyclopropane-1-carboxylic acid
 Azetidine-2-carboxylic acid
 Diacetyl monoxime